Stagnicola elodes is a species of air-breathing freshwater snail, an aquatic pulmonate gastropod mollusk in the family Lymnaeidae, the pond snails.

Taxonomy
There is a very similar species Stagnicola palustris in Europe, and both species could in fact be one and the same species.

Distribution 
The distribution of Stagnicola elodes in North America includes the Great Lakes region and the United States.

Ecology 
Parasites of Stagnicola elodes include:
 Echinostoma revolutum

References

Further reading 
 

Lymnaeidae
Molluscs of North America
Fauna of the Great Lakes region (North America)
Gastropods described in 1821